Sofia Johansdotter Gyllenhielm (1556/59 – June 1583), was a Swedish noble,  the illegitimate daughter of King John III of Sweden and Karin Hansdotter.

Life
She spent her early childhood with her mother in Turku Castle in the Duchy of Finland. In 1562, she and her brother Julius (1559–1583), though not their younger sister, were removed from their mother's custody and kept in their father's household when he married Catherine Jagiellon. When their father and stepmother were imprisoned in 1563, Gyllenhielm and her brother were given into the care of Anna Andersdotter, spouse of Jöran Persson. Persson accepted a bribe Catherine gave him in exchange for returning the children, but he still did not do so. They were returned to their father when John deposed Eric XIV and took the throne in 1568. 

Gyllenhielm became a lady-in-waiting to her aunt Princess Elizabeth of Sweden in 1576. The same year, she was engaged by her father to his favourite, French immigrant Baron Pontus De la Gardie (1520–1585) as a reward for his service for her father. Sofia, her sister Lucretia  Gyllenhielm (1561–1585) and their brother Julius were ennobled in 1577 and given the surname Gyllenhielm.

The wedding was held at Vadstena in Östergötland on 14 January 1580. It was a grand ceremony with many guests, and during the ceremony a church gallery collapsed under the weight of the congregation, resulting in the death of one person. This was interpreted by Catholics present as a divine verdict on heretics.

In 1581, Gyllenhielm accompanied her spouse to his command in Swedish Estonia. 

She died giving birth to Jacob, at Reval, in 1583.

Issue
Pontus De la Gardie and Sofia Gyllenhielm had three children:
 Brita Pontusdotter De la Gardie  (1581–1645)
 Baron Johan De la Gardie (1582–1642), statesman of the Swedish Empire
 Count and Field Marshal Jacob De la Gardie (1583–1652)

References

Other sources
 Ericson Wolke, Lars, Johan III: en biografi, Historiska media, Lund, 2004
 Larsson, Lars-Olof, Arvet efter Gustav Vasa: berättelsen om fyra kungar och ett rike, Prisma, Stockholm, 2005

1550s births
1583 deaths
Swedish nobility
16th-century Swedish people
Illegitimate children of Swedish monarchs
Swedish ladies-in-waiting
Deaths in childbirth
De la Gardie family
Daughters of kings